Skydivin' is the debut solo studio album by British dance musician Darren Styles.

Background

The album debuted at #4 in the UK Albums Chart with sales of 22,197. A month later it was certified gold by the BPI with over 100,000 copies sold.

Track listing

Personnel
 Darren Styles – producer (all tracks), vocals (disc 1 tracks 1, 5, 10, 11, 12, 13, 16 & 17, disc 2 tracks 2, 4, 9, 11 & 13)

Production
 Ultrabeat – producers (disc 1 track 4, disc 2 tracks 6 and 12)
 Hypasonic – producer (disc 1 track 6)
 SHM – producer (disc 1 track 12)
 Styles & Breeze – producers (disc 1 track 15, disc 2 tracks 7, 8, 10 & 13)
 N-Force – producers (disc 2 track 1)
 Kenny Hayes – additional producer, remixing (disc 2 tracks 2, 4, 9 & 11)

Additional musicians
 Francis Hill – vocals (disc 1 tracks 2 & 7)
 Lisa Abbott – vocals (disc 1 track 3, disc 2 tracks 8 & 10)
 Mike Di Scala – vocals (disc 1 track 4; disc 2 track 12)
 Justine Riddoch – vocals (disc 1 track 6; disc 2 track 3)
 Andrea Britton – vocals (disc 1 track 9)
 MC Whizzkid – vocals (disc 1 track 12)
 Wayne G – vocals (disc 1 track 14)
 Karen Danzig – vocals (disc 1 track 15; disc 2 track 7)
 Lois McConnell – vocals (disc 2 track 1)
 Junior – vocals (disc 2 track 5)
 Rebecca Rudd – vocals (disc 2 track 12)

Other personnel
 Iginition – design

Chart performance

Certifications

Release history

References

External links
 
 Skydivin' at Discogs

2008 debut albums
All Around the World Productions albums
Darren Styles albums
Universal Music TV albums